The British Society for Ethical Theory is a philosophical organisation dedicated to philosophical research in normative ethics, meta-ethics, and moral psychology. The society holds an annual conference; and facilitates the exchange of information, drafts of papers, and reviews among its members.

The society was founded by David McNaughton. The current president of the society is Christopher Woodard from the University of Nottingham.

Conferences
 1996: University of Keele. Keynotes: Jonathan Dancy, James Lenman, Nick Zangwill.
 1997: Lancaster University. Keynotes: Rosalind Hursthouse, David McNaughton.
 1998: University of Kent. Keynotes: James Griffin, R. Jay Wallace.
 1999: University of Durham. Keynotes: Sabina Lovibond, Peter Railton.
 2000: Erasmus University, Rotterdam. Keynotes: Gerald Dworkin, Philip Pettit.
2001: University of Glasgow. Keynotes: John Broome, Michael Smith.
2002: University of Reading. Keynotes: David Copp, Susan Hurley.
2003: Queens University, Belfast. Keynotes: Simon Blackburn, Michael Slote.
2004: University of Kent. Keynotes: Allan Gibbard, Brad Hooker.
2005: University of Leeds. Keynotes: Stephen Darwall, John Skorupski.
2006: University of Southampton. Keynotes: Mark Timmons, Joseph Raz.
2007: University of Bristol. Keynotes: Roger Crisp, David Velleman.
2008: University of Edinburgh. Keynotes: Barbara Herman, Wlodek Rabinowicz.
2009: University of Reading. Keynotes: James Lenman, Jeff McMahan.
2010: University of Nottingham.  Keynotes: James Dreier, Tim Mulgan.
2011. St Anne’s College, University of Oxford. Keynotes: Michael Otsuka, Susan Wolf.
2012: University of Stirling. Keynotes: Sarah Broadie, Frances Kamm.
2013: Institute of Philosophy, University of London. Keynotes: Robert M. Adams, Jennifer Hornsby.
2014: Fitzwilliam College, University of Cambridge. Keynotes: Miranda Fricker, Samuel Scheffler.
2015: University of Southampton. Keynotes: Shelly Kagan, Onoro O’Neill.
2016: Cardiff University. Keynotes: Marcia Baron, Simon Kirchin.
2017: Clifton Hill House, University of Bristol. Keynotes: Janet Radcliffe Richards, Peter Railton.
2018: Humanities Research Institute, University of Sheffield. Keynotes: Ruth Chang, Cécile Fabre.
2019: University of Glasgow.  Keynotes: Nomy Arpaly, David Owens.
 2021: Online. Keynotes: Alison Hills, David Enoch.

References

External links
 

Ethics organizations
Philosophical societies in the United Kingdom